The 4th Connecticut Regiment was raised on April 27, 1775, at Hartford, Connecticut. The regiment saw action in the Invasion of Canada. After which the regiment was disbanded on December 20, 1775, and reformed on September 16, 1776, to fight in the Battle of Brandywine, Battle of Germantown and the Battle of Monmouth. The regiment was merged along with the 3rd Connecticut Regiment into the 1st Connecticut Regiment on January 1, 1783, at West Point, New York.

See also
4th Connecticut Infantry Regiment - Civil War unit with this designation

References

External links
 Bibliography of Connecticut's participation in the Continental Army compiled by the United States Army Center of Military History

Connecticut regiments of the Continental Army
History of Hartford, Connecticut